Aaru Pushpangal is a 1977 Indian Tamil-language film directed by K. M. Balakrishnan. It stars Rajinikanth, Vijayakumar and Srividya, with Y. Vijaya, Pandari Bai, S. V. Sahasranamam, Suruli Rajan and Manorama in supporting roles. It was released 10 November 1977.

Plot

Cast 
Rajinikanth as Ravi
Y. Vijaya as Kumutha
Srividya as Mallika
Vijayakumar as Raja
Suruli Rajan as Kanthasamy
V. K. Ramasamy as Bangarusamy
Manorama as Meera (Guest appearance)
Pandari Bai as Malliga and Kumutha's mother

Production 
Aaru Pushpangal is the first film where Rajinikanth and Vijayakumar acted together.

Soundtrack 
The soundtrack was composed by  M. S. Viswanathan. "Yendi Muthamma" is the debut of Chandrabose as a singer.

References

Bibliography

External links 
 

1970s Tamil-language films
1977 films
Films scored by M. S. Viswanathan
Indian black-and-white films